Blepharomastix griseicosta is a moth in the family Crambidae. It was described by George Hampson in 1918. It is found in Peru.

The wingspan is 26–28 mm. The forewings are silvery white with a grey-brown costal area and a faint brown antemedial line, as well as a curved dark brown discoidal striga. The postmedial line is grey brown with a blackish bar at the costa and there is a grey-brown terminal line. The hindwings are silvery white with a pale grey-brown postmedial line and a grey-brown terminal line, except towards the tornus.

References

Moths described in 1918
Blepharomastix